Landon Trusty (born October 9, 1981 in Hot Springs, Arkansas) was an American football tight end.

Trusty was most recently on the Injured reserve for 2006 season with the Denver Broncos of the NFL after tearing his anterior cruciate ligament in spring minicamp.  The Broncos released him in May 2007.

Landon Trusty attended Lakeside High School in Hot Springs Arkansas. Currently, he still holds the record for most passing yards in a season. Trusty also led Lakeside to their only basketball state championship.

References

1981 births
American football tight ends
Central Arkansas Bears football players
Denver Broncos players
Living people
Sportspeople from Hot Springs, Arkansas